Kabgan (also Romanized as Kabgān; also known as Kābghān, Kabkān, and Kapkan) is a village in Kabgan Rural District, Kaki District, Dashti County, Bushehr Province, Iran. At the 2006 census, its population was 231, in 59 families.

References 

Populated places in Dashti County